This is a list of libraries in the Federal Republic of Germany. There is a much more extensive list available on the German Wikipedia. There are about 6,313 public libraries in Germany.

National Libraries 
 German National Library (Deutsche Nationalbibliothek; incl. Collection of German Prints (Sammlung Deutscher Drucke)), Frankfurt am Main and Leipzig
 German National Library of Economics (Deutsche Zentralbibliothek für Wirtschaftswissenschaften), Kiel and Hamburg
 German National Library of Medicine  (Deutsche Zentralbibliothek für Medizin), Cologne
 German National Library of Science and Technology (Technische Informationsbibliothek), Hanover

State and regional libraries 

Baden State Library (Badische Landesbibliothek), Karlsruhe
Bamberg State Library (Staatsbibliothek Bamberg), Bamberg
 Bavarian State Library (Bayerische Staatsbibliothek), Munich
 Berlin State Library (Staatsbibliothek zu Berlin), Berlin
 Berlin Central and Regional Library, the library for the city and state of Berlin
 Göttingen State and University Library (Niedersächsische Staats- und Universitätsbibliothek Göttingen), Göttingen
 Prussian Heritage Image Archive (Bildarchiv Preußischer Kulturbesitz), Berlin
Saarland University and State Library (Saarländische Universitäts- und Landesbibliothek), Saarland
 Saxon State Library (Sächsische Landesbibliothek), Dresden
 Württemberg State Library (Württembergische Landesbibliothek), Stuttgart

City libraries 
 Braunschweig Public Library (Stadtbibliothek Braunschweig), Braunschweig
 Cologne Public Library (StadtBibliothek Köln), Cologne
 Stuttgart Public Library (Stadtbücherei Stuttgart), Stuttgart
Berlin City Library (Stadtbibliothek Berlin), Berlin

List of City Libraries in Rhineland-Palatinate 

 Koblenz City Library (Stadtbibliothek Koblenz), Koblenz
 Central Library (Zentralbibliothek Koblenz)
 Koblenz-Horchheim District Library (Stadtteilbücherei Horchheim)
 Koblenz-Karthause District Library (Stadtteilbücherei Karthause)
 Koblenz-Pfaffendorfer-Höhe District Library (Stadtteilbücherei Pfaffendorfer-Höhe)
 Ludwigshafen City Library (Stadtbibliothek Ludwigshafen), Ludwigshafen
 Mainz City Library (Stadtbibliothek Mainz), Mainz
 Trier Public Library (Stadtbibliothek Trier), Trier
 Worms City Library (Stadtbibliothek Worms), Worms

Specialized libraries 
 American Memorial Library (Amerika-Gedenkbibliothek), Berlin
 Berlin Art Library (Kunstbibliothek Berlin), part of the Berlin State Museums
 Deutsche Fotothek, a picture library in Dresden, Saxony
 Duchess Anna Amalia Library, Weimar, Thuringia
 Gottfried Wilhelm Leibniz Bibliothek, Hanover
 German Esperanto Library, Aalen, Baden-Württemberg
 German Central Library for the Blind (Deutsche Zentralbücherei für Blinde), Leipzig
 Herzog August Library, Wolfenbüttel, Lower Saxony
 Library of Friedrich Nietzsche (Nietzsche-Archiv), Weimar, Thuringia
 Lippe State Library, Detmold, North Rhine-Westphalia
 Monacensia, Munich, Bavaria
 Phantastische Bibliothek Wetzlar, Wetzlar, Hesse
 Philatelic Library Hamburg (Philatelistische Bibliothek), Hamburg
 UNESCO Institute for Lifelong Learning Library, Hamburg
 Virtual Library of Musicology (Virtuelle Fachbibliothek Musikwissenschaft), Munich, Bavaria
 West German Library for the Blind (Westdeutsche Blindenhörbücherei), Münster, North Rhine-Westphalia
 Zeno.org, a German digital library

University libraries 
 Augsburg University Library (Universitätsbibliothek Augsburg), Augsburg
 Bamberg University Library (Universitätsbibliothek Bamberg), Bamberg
 Bonn University Library (Universitätsbibliothek Bonn), Bonn
 Braunschweig University Library (Universitätsbibliothek Braunschweig), Braunschweig
 Darmstadt University and State Library (Universitäts- und Landesbibliothek Darmstadt), Darmstadt
 Düsseldorf University and State Library (Universitäts- und Landesbibliothek Düsseldorf), Düsseldorf
 Frankfurt University Library (Universitätsbibliothek Frankfurt am Main), Frankfurt
 Freiburg University Library (Universitätsbibliothek Freiburg), Freiburg
 Göttingen State and University Library (Niedersächsische Staats- und Universitätsbibliothek Göttingen), Göttingen
 Greifswald University Library (Universitätsbibliothek Greifswald), Greifswald
 Heidelberg University Library(Universitätsbibliothek Heidelberg), Heidelberg
 Hamburg University Library (Universitätsbibliothek der Universität Hamburg), Hamburg
 Hanover University Library (Universitätsbibliothek Hannover), Hannover
 Kaiserlautern University Library (Universitätsbibliothek Kaiserlautern), Kaiserlautern
 KIT Library (Universitätsbibliothek Karlsruhe), Karlsruhe
 Kassel University Library (Universitätsbibliothek Kassel), Kassel
 Koblenz-Landau University Library (Universitätsbibliothek Koblenz-Landau), Koblenz and Landau
 Leipzig University Library (Universitätsbibliothek Leipzig), Leipzig
 Ludwigshafen University Library (Hochschulbibliothek Ludwigshafen), Ludwigshafen
 Mainz University Library (Universitätsbibliothek Mainz), Mainz
 Mannheim University Library (Universitätsbibliothek Mannheim), Mannheim
 Philological Library (Philologische Bibliothek) of the Free University of Berlin
 Potsdam University Library(Universitätsbibliothek Potsdam), Potsdam
 PsyDok, a digital Psychology library supported by Saarland University, Saarland
 Saarland University and State Library (Saarländische Universitäts- und Landesbibliothek), Saarland
 Stuttgart University Library (Universitätsbibliothek Stuttgart), Stuttgart
 Tübingen University Library (Universitätsbibliothek Tübingen), Tübingen
 Ulm University Library (Universitätsbibliothek Ulm), Ulm
 Wuppertal University Library (Universitätsbibliothek Wuppertal), Wuppertal

German libraries abroad 
 Kunsthistorisches Institut in Florenz, Florence, Italy
 Bibliotheca Hertziana – Max Planck Institute for Art History, Rome, Italy
 German Historical Institute Library, Rome, Italy
 German Historical Institute Library, Paris, France
 German Historical Institute Library, London, England 
 German Historical Institute Library, Washington, D.C., USA
 German Historical Institute Library, Warsaw, Poland
 German Historical Institute Library, Moscow, Russia
 Goethe-Institut libraries (95 locations)

Former libraries in Germany 
 Bibliotheca Palatina, the most important library of the German Renaissance, Heidelberg
 Berlin Singakademie Library, looted in 1945 and as of 2000 temporarily housed at the Berlin State Library
 Königsberg Public Library in Königsberg, East Prussia
 Königsberg State and University Library in Königsberg, East Prussia

Library associations 
 International Association of Technological University Libraries, Düsseldorf
  (est. 1900)

See also 
 Books in Germany
 List of archives in Germany
 List of libraries in Austria
 List of libraries in Switzerland
 Open access in Germany to scholarly communication

References

Further reading
  1954-

External links 
 Bibliotheken in Deutschland 
 List of Libraries in Germany
 Dossier Goethe-Institut "Deutsche Bibliotheken im Porträt" 

 
 
Libraries
libraries